The Panther Solo is a mid-engined sports car that was made by the British company Panther Car Company. It was available as a two-seat coupé, with the option of additional rear seats to make it a 2+2. SsangYong Motor Company, which had become the owner of Panther Westwinds, made a concept car called the SsangYong Solo 3 as a tribute to the original Solo and Solo 2, as well as a racing version called the SsangYong Solo Le Mans.

Solo 1

The first Solo, the Solo 1, was a simple mid-engined rear wheel drive car. It had a Ford 1.6 CVH Engine (as fitted in the Ford Fiesta XR2) and was designed as a replacement for the marque's volume model, the Panther Kallista. The car used relatively simple technology, had contemporary styling and was manufactured with a fibreglass body to reduce its weight. However, Toyota launched its second generation MR2 around the same time and the Solo was unable to compete with its rival.

The South Korean owner of Panther, Y. C. Kim, made the decision to amend the Solo after taking a vacation in Guam where he saw one of the early MR2s. A new styling design for the Solo was created by Ken Greenley of the London RCA vehicle styling school. The restyled car featured a slightly larger 2+2 layout with a composite upper body, permanent four wheel drive and a mid-mounted engine from a Ford Sierra Cosworth. This would be called the "Solo 2".
The body engineering designers involved were Martin Freestone (composites), Keith Hunter (underbody and structure) and William "Bill" Davies (details).

Solo 2
The Solo 2 used the Ford Sierra RS  engine with twice the horsepower of the Solo 1. It was mated to the Borg-Warner T-5 (same as in the RS), which drove a Ferguson four-wheel drive system modified by Panther to use XR4x4 components, including both differentials. The company decided also to stretch the wheelbase to accommodate 2+2 seating,  which was partly done by ex-Ford Europe engineers who had worked on the Sierra Cosworth and XR4x4. March did the aerodynamics, producing a Cd of 0.33, as well as producing the composite construction, encouraged by March chairman Robin Herd. One of the development cars had a twin turbo setup due to the known turbo lag issues.

A troublesome area was with the 4 wheel drive transfer box. This was a custom made part, the internals were chain-driven and the chains had a propensity for self-destruction under heavy engine load.

The lower body of the Solo 2 was a space frame made primarily of steel with the upper body being made from aluminium honeycomb sandwiched between multiple sheets of impregnated glass fibre bonded with epoxy. The upper body was to be glued using an aerospace adhesive to the lower chassis. No rollbar was needed. Suspension used Escort struts in front, while the disc brakes were fitted with Scorpio-derived ABS.

It is not known exactly how many vehicles were built (believed to have been between 12 and 25), as sometimes Panther would change the chassis number of prototype cars. All but three Solos were sold to the public, two were destroyed and one is still owned by the owner of Panther.
One vehicle was written off by a motoring journalist who walked away unhurt from the wreckage.

As of 2020, 11 examples survive in the UK, with all but one listed as SORN (Statutory Off Road Notification, to legally notify the government that the vehicle will not be driven on public roads).

Cars

Sources and further reading

Solo
Sports cars
Rear mid-engine, rear-wheel-drive vehicles
Rear mid-engine, all-wheel-drive vehicles
Cars introduced in 1989
Cars discontinued in 1990